Rena Gaile is a Canadian country music artist. Gaile's first single, "Make Time for Love," was released in 1983. She released an additional seven singles between 1989 and 1993 before issuing her first studio album, Out on a Limb, in 1995. This album produced seven singles for her on the Canadian country music charts, of which the highest was the No. 10-peaking "Cloud of Dust."

Gaile was nominated for Outstanding New Artist at the RPM Big Country Awards in 1993 and 1996. She also received a nomination for Female Artist of the Year at the 1997 Canadian Country Music Association Awards.

Her second album, At Your Feet, was released in 2001. "Just as I Am" was named Southern Gospel Song of the Year at the 2001 CGMA Covenant Awards. A third album, One People, followed in 2004.

Discography

Albums

Singles

Music videos

References

External links
Official Site

Canadian women country singers
Canadian women singers
Living people
Year of birth missing (living people)